The Forty-third Oklahoma Legislature was a meeting of the legislative branch of the government of Oklahoma, composed of the Senate and the House of Representatives. State legislators met at the Oklahoma State Capitol in Oklahoma City from January 8 to May 31, 1991, and from January 3 to May 29, 1992, during the second two years of the term of Governor David Walters.

Stratton Taylor served as the President pro tempore of the Oklahoma Senate and Glen D. Johnson, Jr. served as the Speaker of the Oklahoma House of Representatives.

Dates of sessions
Organizational day: January 8, 1991
Special session: January 14–18, 1991
First regular session: February–May 31, 1991
Second regular session: February 3-May 29, 1992
Previous: 42nd Legislature • Next: 44th Legislature

Party composition

Senate

House of Representatives

Leadership
President Pro Tempore: Robert V. Cullison
Majority Leader of the Oklahoma Senate:  Darryl F. Roberts
 Speaker: Glen D. Johnson, Jr.
 Speaker Pro Tempore: Jim Glover
 Majority Floor Leader: Lloyd Benson
 Caucus Chair: Gary Charles Bastin
 House Minority leader, first regular session: Joe Heaton
 House Minority leader, second regular session: Larry Ferguson

Staff
Chief Clerk of the House: Larry Warden

Members

Senate

Table based on state almanac.

House of Representatives

Table based on government database.

References

External links
Oklahoma Senate
Oklahoma House of Representatives

Oklahoma legislative sessions
1991 in Oklahoma
1992 in Oklahoma
1991 U.S. legislative sessions
1992 U.S. legislative sessions